Barbara Carroll Pringle (née Terlesky; born 1939) was a member of the Ohio House of Representatives.  She initially won a term in 1982, and went on to serve until 2000, when she was term limited. She is best remembered for being a key player in the DeRolph education funding debates in the 1990s.

External links

Profile on the Ohio Ladies' Gallery website

References

Living people
Democratic Party members of the Ohio House of Representatives
Women state legislators in Ohio
1939 births
21st-century American women